USCS Baton Rouge, later USC&GS Baton Rouge, was a stern-wheel steamer that served as a survey ship in the United States Coast Survey from 1875 to 1878 and in the United States Coast and Geodetic Survey from 1878 to 1880.

Baton Rouge was built for the Coast Survey by S.D. Bardmore at Louisville, Kentucky, and entered service in 1875. In 1878, the Coast Survey was renamed the U.S. Coast and Geodetic Survey.

Baton Rouge sank in the Mississippi River on 26 December 1880. She apparently was raised and sold in 1881.

References
 NOAA History, A Science Odyssey: Tools of the Trade: Ships: Coast and Geodetic Survey Ships: Baton Rouge

Ships of the United States Coast and Geodetic Survey
Survey ships of the United States
Ships built in Kentucky
1875 ships
Louisiana-related ships
Maritime incidents in December 1880
Shipwrecks of the Mississippi River